The Makhutswi River is a short river in Limpopo Province, South Africa. It flows northeastwards and is a tributary of the Olifants River, joining it in its central basin.

See also
 List of rivers of South Africa

References

External links
The Olifants River Basin, South Africa
The Olifants River System
The Olifants River

Olifants River (Limpopo)
Rivers of Limpopo